South Adelaide Panthers is a NBL1 Central club based in Adelaide, South Australia. The club fields both a men's and women's team. The club is a division of the overarching South Adelaide Basketball Club (SABC), the major administrative basketball organisation in Adelaide's southern suburbs. The Panthers play their home games at Marion Basketball Stadium.

Club history
The South Adelaide Basketball Club (SABC) was formed in 1952. It was one of the foundation clubs in the sport of basketball in South Australia.

1957 saw the formation of the South Australian State League with both a men's and women's competition. South Adelaide, trading as the Panthers, entered a team into both competitions. The women were grand finalists in their first two seasons, finishing as runners-up to North Adelaide in 1957 and as champions in 1958 after defeating Eagles.

On 26 September 1963, the men's team made history after defeating Budapest in their first ever grand final. The game heralded the start of an era for South Adelaide, with the Panthers men continuing on to claim 10 men's State championships (1963-65-66-69-73-87-89-91-95-97) over the ensuing decades.

South Adelaide's three decades of dominance ended in 1998 with a 105–88 loss to Noarlunga City in the grand final. The women on the other hand saw dwindling prospects following 1958, with their only other grand final appearance coming in 2003, a game which saw them lose 74–51 to Forestville. In 2022, the men's team won the NBL1 Central Grand Final to claim their first championship since 1997.

Retired numbers
In March 2015, the Panthers retired the playing numbers of three of the club's greatest men's players: Michael Ah Matt (#8), Scott Ninnis (#9) and Mark Davis (#33). The three jerseys hang in the rafters at Marion Stadium.

Ah Matt in 1963 led the Panthers to the first of their 10 titles while twice winning the St George Trophy—now the Frank Angove Medal—as the fairest and most brilliant player in South Australia, under 21. Ninnis arguably is one of the most successful Australian basketball players of all time, having won titles at every senior level. He was a star for South Adelaide, winning the 1995 Woollacott Medal as the state's fairest and most brilliant player and winning championships with the club in 1987, 1995 and 1997. American forward Davis was brought to Adelaide by South in 1985 when the club was looking for an import and was told there was one "killing it" in New Zealand. Davis won five championships with the Panthers and a record five Woollacott Medals.

References

External links
SABC's official website

Premier League (Australia) teams
Basketball teams established in 1957
Basketball clubs in Adelaide
1957 establishments in Australia